Allium kujukense is a species of onion in the genus Allium. This species is in the family Amaryllidaceae and is endemic all over South-East Kazakhstan. This species has a bulbous geophyte.

References

kujukense
Flora of Kazakhstan
Plants described in 1923